N. Dharam Singh is the 17th Chief Minister of Karnataka.

Dharam Singh may also refer to:
 Dharam Singh (field hockey) (1919–2001), field hockey player
 Dharam Singh (field hockey, born 1937), field hockey player
 Dharam Singh (Sikhism) (1666–1708), one of the Panj Payare

People with the given names
 Dharam Singh Deol or Dharmendra
 Dharam Singh Uppal (1959–2013), Indian former international athlete
 Dharam Singh Hayatpur (1884–1926), member of Sikh political and religious group the Babbar Akali Movement
 Dharam Singh Nihang Singh (born 1936), founder of Sachkhoj Academy

See also 
 Dharma

Singh, Dharam